The Avon Valley Railway (AVR) is a three-mile-long heritage railway based at Bitton station in South Gloucestershire, England, between Bristol and Bath and is operated by a local group: The Avon Valley Railway Company Ltd.  The railway follows the Avon Valley south-east from Oldland Common, through Bitton and alongside the River Avon towards Kelston and Bath. The railway shares its route with the Sustrans cycleway and footpath, the Bristol and Bath Railway Path.

History

The railway is part of the otherwise-dismantled Midland Railway Mangotsfield and Bath branch line, which was closed in 1966 as a result of the Beeching cuts, due mainly to the Great Western Railway, which also connected Bristol and Bath, being just a few miles to the south.

The railway is perhaps best known for connecting the former Somerset and Dorset Joint Railway (S&DJR), whose northern terminus was at Bath Green Park station, with the London, Midland and Scottish Railway (LMS). The Midland Railway lines along the Avon Valley thus opened up the S&D lines to travellers from the British industrial Midlands. This was particularly so during summer Saturdays when families flocked south to the beaches of Dorset and the English south coast. Many extra trains thus had to be added to the schedule to accommodate this increased demand. Although owned and run by the Midland Railway, many S&D locomotives were often seen working trains along this line.

After the lines were removed, from 2000 the northern section from Mangotsfield to Warmley was used to build a dual carriage development of the A4174 road, although both station sites currently still exist. The remainder of the line was passed from the British Railways Board to Sustrans, who in co-operation with the local councils developed the Bristol and Bath Railway Path. Further development of the heritage railway is wholly dependent on a usage agreement with Sustrans.

Preservation

Bitton station and its yard, including some trackbed, was leased from British Railways Board by the Bristol Suburban Railway Society, a group of local volunteers intent on restoring commuter and weekend steam use to the Bristol–Mangotsfield–Bath and Mangotsfield–Yate railway routes.

Work progressed slowly over the years restoring the heavily vandalised buildings and laying track north towards Oldland Common and Warmley. Weekend steam-hauled 'brake van' train rides progressed to proper passenger services along the ever-lengthening line in restored 1950s British Railways Mark 1 carriages.

In 1979, the Bristol Suburban Railway Society was incorporated into the Bitton Railway Co. Ltd. and the laid track reached Oldland Common in 1988. By 1992, however, the city of Bristol had expanded greatly, with houses encroaching upon the former railway line, and expansion north to Warmley and Mangotsfield was no longer considered practical. The line thus began to expand south out into the valley of the River Avon. By 2004, it had crossed the Avon and a new station was built to service the Avon Valley Country Park — a large picnic and recreation site — along with a river wharf to provide visitors with connections to river barges and river boat trips.

Building of a new buffet and toilet facility at Bitton station began in 2007 to replace the current buffet and toilets and to increase space for the railway's gift shop. Work continues to extend the railway south-east towards Bath (potentially as far as Newbridge).

As a tourist attraction, the Avon Valley Railway now handles 80,000 visitors per year. The AVR provides round-trip steam train travel from Bitton Station north to Oldland Common then south to Avon Riverside station. The line is open to travellers on most weekends.

Incidents

On 24 July 2018, during a shunting operation at Bitton station, two empty coaches ran away for 43 yards (40 metres) on a down gradient until they collided with a level crossing gate closed across the track. The coaches, which had no handbrakes, overrode chocks placed against two wheels. There were no injuries.

Motive power

Resident Steam locomotives

Resident Diesel locomotives

Previous Resident Locomotives

References

External links

 Avon Valley Railway — Official site
 London Midland Society, restoring LMS 4F No. 4123

Rail transport in Bristol
Heritage railways in South Gloucestershire District